Sergey Khovanskiy (born December 2, 1977) is a Russian sprint canoer who has competed since the late 2000s. He won three bronze medals in the K-4 200 m event at the ICF Canoe Sprint World Championships, earning them in 2006, 2007, and 2009.

References
Canoe09.ca profile 

1977 births
Living people
Russian male canoeists
ICF Canoe Sprint World Championships medalists in kayak
Saratov State Agrarian University alumni